The Star was a sailing event in the sailing program of the 1956 Summer Olympics, held on Port Phillip. Seven races were scheduled. 24 sailors, on 12 boats, from 12 nations competed.

Results 

DNF = Did Not Finish, DNS= Did Not Start, DSQ = Disqualified 
 = Male,  = Female

Daily standings

Conditions on Port Phillip 
Three race areas were needed during the Olympics on Port Phillip. Each of the classesused the same scoring system. The northern course was used for the Star.

Notes

References 
 
 
 

Star
Star (keelboat) competitions